There are over 230 Catholics in the Falkland Islands, approximately 10% of the total population. There are no dioceses in the islands, instead they form an apostolic prefecture which was erected in January 1952. It is immediately subject to the Holy See and separate from any Argentine or UK dioceses. The spiritual leader of the prefecture is Father Hugh Allan who was appointed in 2016.

The Eucharist is celebrated at RAF Mount Pleasant.

St Mary's Catholic Church
St Mary's Catholic Church in Ross Road in Stanley is the sole Catholic Church on the Falkland Islands. It was blessed in 1899. On the west wall is a "pictorial history" of the Catholic Church in the Falkland Islands; it was illustrated by the local artist James Peck.

Religious affiliation

References

External links
 Statistics relating to the Apostolic Prefecture of the Falkland Islands
Statistics relating to the Major Religions of the Falkland Islands
Original Source of Information used by the Major Religions of the Falkland Islands website

 
Falkland
Falkland